Trois-Rivières is a provincial electoral district in the Mauricie region of Quebec, Canada that elects members to the National Assembly of Quebec. It includes part of the city of Trois-Rivières, including most of the territory of the city as it existed prior to its 2002 amalgamation and expansion.

It was created for the 1867 election, and an electoral district of that name existed even earlier: see Trois-Rivières (Lower Canada) and Trois-Rivières (Province of Canada electoral district).

In the change from the 2001 to the 2011 electoral map, its border with the Maskinongé electoral district was adjusted, resulting in simultaneously gaining and losing different parts of the city of Trois-Rivières.

Members of the Legislative Assembly / National Assembly

Election results

|}

^ Change is from redistributed results. CAQ change is from ADQ.

See also

 History of Canada
 History of Quebec
 List of mayors of Trois-Rivières
 Mauricie
 Politics of Canada
 Politics of Quebec
 Trois-Rivières
 Trois-Rivières Federal Electoral District
 District of Trois-Rivières (Lower Canada)
 District of Trois-Rivières (Province of Canada)

References

External links
Information
 Elections Quebec

Election results
 Election results (National Assembly)

Maps
 2011 map (PDF)
 2001 map (Flash)
2001–2011 changes (Flash)
1992–2001 changes (Flash)
 Electoral map of Mauricie region
 Quebec electoral map, 2011

Politics of Trois-Rivières
Quebec provincial electoral districts